Ingrid is a Swedish artist collective and record label founded in 2012. They released their first compilation on Record Store Day in 2012. The collective's musical work is notable for containing multiple side-projects by its members that do not adhere to the line-ups of their primary ventures; for example, Björn Yttling has a track entitled "Cuban Lips" under the stage name Yttling Jazz on the Ingrid Volym 1 compilation; however, he is also featured as a member of the band Smile along with Teddybears member Joakim Åhlund. All of the bands featured on the compilation are of this nature or are solo works. The record label has been managed by Niklas Hallberg since March 2013.

Members
Ingrid was founded by thirteen artists and musicians, all Scandinavian or American in origin; the founding members are as follow:

 Lykke Li
 Peter Bjorn & John, including solo work by Peter Morén, Björn Yttling and John Eriksson (Eriksson used the pseudonym 'Hortlax Cobra')
 Andrew Wyatt and Pontus Winnberg of the band Miike Snow
 Joakim Åhlund of Teddybears, Caesars and Les Big Byrd.
 Coco Morier
 Jonas Torvestig
 Tomas Nordmark

Releases

2012:

 Various artists – Ingrid Volym 1 (Album)
 Smile – A Flash In The Night (Album)
 Hortlax Cobra – Night Shift (Album)
 Starlight Serenaders – Summer Drones (EP)
 Coco Morier – Strangers May Kiss (EP)
 A Nighthawk – Until I Faltered I Wasn't Free (EP)
 Peter Morén – Pyramiden (Album)
 Peter Morén –  Säg mitt namn  (Single)
 Peter Morén –  Tröstpriset  (Single)
 Woodlands – River running wild (Single)
 Woodlands – Woodlands (Album)
 Kriget – Dragons (Single)
 Kriget – Dystopico (Album)
 El Perro Del Mar – Walk On By (El Perro Del Mar song)|Walk On By (Single) 
 El Perro Del Mar – Pale Fire (Album) (released in the UK by Memphis Industries) 
 El Perro Del Mar – Hold Off the Dawn (Single) 
 Little Children – In Hau (EP)
 Hortlax Cobra – 1984 (Album)

2013:

 El Perro Del Mar – I Was a Boy (Single)
 Shadow Shadow – Riviera (Single)
 Shadow Shadow – 1000001 (Single)
 Shadow Shadow – Riviera (Album)
 Andrew Wyatt – Descender (Album)
 David Lynch – The Big Dream (Album)
 Tussilago – Tussilago (EP)
 David Lynch & Lykke Li  – I'm Waiting Here (Single)
 David Lynch – Are You Sure (Single)
 Tussilago – Tussilago (EP)
 Amason – Margins (Single)
 Amason – Went to War (Single)
 Amason – EP (EP)
 Gunwolf – Get Ready To Get Killed (Album)
 The Suzan – Moving on (Single)
 A Nighthawk – Here We Are, Out In the Open (EP)
 Peter Morén – Broken Swenglish Vol. 1 (EP)

2014:

 Yttling Jazz – Oh Lord Why Can't I Keep My Mouth Shut (Re-release)
 Amason – Ålen (Single)
 Lykke Li – Du är den ende (Single)
 Little Majorette & Pontus Winnberg – Wonder (Single)
 Tussilago – Say Hello (Single)
 Max von Sydow – Ugly Girls Ugly Boys (Single)
 Chrissie Hynde – Stockholm (Album)
 David Lynch – The Big Dream Remix EP (EP)
 Chrissie Hynde – Dark Sunglasses (Single)
 Chrissie Hynde – Dark You or No One (Single)
 Xander Duell – Earth On It's Axis (Single)
 Peter Morén – I Spåren Av Tåren (Re-release)
 Peter Morén – Broken Swenglish, Vol. 2 (EP)
 Chrissie Hynde – Down the Wrong Way (Single)
 Chrissie Hynde – Adding the Blue (Single)
 Amason – Duvan (Single)

2015:

 Amason – Sky City (Album)
 Amason – Kelly (Singe)
 Dolores Haze – I Got My Gun (Single)
 Tussilago – My Own Dear (Single)
 Ingrid – Volym 2 (Album)
 Tussilago – Holy Train (Album)
 Amason – Yellow Moon (Single)
 Chris Olsson – Thin Love (Single)
 Hortlax Cobra – I'm Still Here / Night Still Young (Single)
 Astropol – The Sound Of A Heart That Breaks (Single)
 Xander Duell – Wade Laiste (Album)
 Amason – Spotify Sessions (Album)
 Astropol – Just Before Our Love Got Lost (Single)
 Vulkano – Smiley Faces (Single)
 Vulkano – Iridescence (Album)

2016:

 Amanda Bergman – "Docks"
 MishCatt – "EP" (EP)
 Amason – "California Dreamin' EP" (EP)
 Peter Bjorn and John – "Breakin' Point"
 liv – "Wings of Love" (single) 
 Amanda Bergman – "Flickering Lights EP"

Shows
 Ingrid had their premier as a live act when they played at the Swedish music festival Way Out West in the summer of 2012. During that performance all of the founding members participated and the concert's special guest was the Swedish musician José González. This concert took place at Trädgården in Gothenburg.
 The second time Ingrid performed live was at Roskildefestivalen during the summer of 2013 where they played with Chrissie Hynde and the Swedish musician Tallest Man on Earth. During this concert the two founding members Jocke Åhlund and Coco Morier could not participate.
 Ingrid Disco was a new constellation that the collective introduced at Way Out West the summer of 2013 when they played at Gothenburg Film Studios among a lot of established musicians such as Disclosure, Markus Krunegård, Ingrid-signed Tussilago and Amason and Zilverzurfarn.

Studios
Ingrid as a record label has two different studios – Ingrid and Spegeln. The two studios are owned by Björn Yttling, Nille Perned and Pontus Winnberg.
 Ingrid is located in the former studio KMH/Polarstudion at Södermalm. This studio is the bigger one of the two and it usually here where most of the recordings take place.
 Spegeln is a combination of the HQ as well as a smaller studio, often used for both rehearsal time as well as recording. Spegeln is also located Södermalm.

References

External links
 Official website

Swedish record labels
2012 establishments in Sweden
Record labels established in 2012